Trimeresurus medoensis, commonly named the Motuo bamboo pitviper, is a venomous pitviper species endemic to India, Burma, and Tibet. No subspecies are currently recognized.

Description

The hemipenes are short, thick, and spinose.

Scalation: dorsal scales in 17 longitudinal rows at midbody, of which rows 7-11 are slightly keeled. There are 8 upper labials, of which the first are separated from the nasal scales by a distinct suture. The ventrals number less than 150.

Color pattern: green or bluish green above, yellowish white below, the two separated by a bright bicolored red (below) and white (above) ventrolateral stripe (in both males and females), which occupies the whole of the outermost scale row and a portion of the second row.

Geographic range
Found in North-Eastern India; northern Burma (Myanmar); and southeastern Xizang (Tibet), China. The type locality listed is "near A-ni Bridge, Medo Xian, Xizang [Tibet], alt. 1,200 m [3,900 ft]" [Autonomous Region, China].

References

Further reading

David, Patrick; and Tong, Haiyan. 1997. Translations of Recent Descriptions of Chinese Pitvipers of the Trimeresurus-Complex (Serpentes, Viperidae), with a Key to the Complex in China and Adjacent Areas. Smithsonian Herpetological Information Service (112): 1-31.
 David, Patrick; Ashok Captain; and Bharat B. Bhatt. 2002 [2001]. On the occurrence of Trimeresurus medoensis Djao in: Djao & Jaing, 1977 (Serpentes, Viperidae, Crotalinae) in India, with a redescription of the species and notes on its biology. Hamadryad 26 (2): 210-226.
Djao, Er-mie; and Jiang, Yao-ming. 1977. A survey of reptiles in Xizang Autonomous Region, with faunal analysis and descriptions of new forms. Acta Zoologica Sinica 23: 64-67.

External links
 

medoensis
Reptiles of Myanmar
Reptiles of China
Reptiles of India
Reptiles described in 1977
Taxa named by Zhao Ermi